Records of Brazilian football club Cruzeiro Esporte Clube.

Records and statistics

Campeonato Brasileiro Série A record
 italic = ongoing

Campeonato Brasileiro Série B record
 italic = ongoing

Top appearances

 stats updated as of January 5, 2022
 italic = active player

Top scorers

Notable season statistics

2003 Serie A Title Campaign
In 2003 Cruzeiro won the National Triple Crown, winning national cup and both the state and national championships. The stats below regard the historical, record breaking Serie A title achieved that year, with 100 points and breaking the 100 goal mark. To this day, no team has won the title with a higher point percentage. That year, Cruzeiro also set a record for the most consecutive wins in the Campeonato Brasileiro Série A. On two occasions, the team won 8 games in a row, a record which is still unbeaten.

The team that year was led by coach Vanderlei Luxemburgo and captain/midfielder Alex, with many other notable players in the squad, such as 1994 FIFA World Cup winner Zinho, along with Colombia national football team legend Aristizábal, Brazil national football team regulars Gomes, Cris, Luisão, Maicon and Felipe Melo, as well as big name players such as Claudio Maldonado, Deivid de Souza, Maurinho and Edu Dracena.

Cruzeiro and defending champions Santos FC fought hard for the lead for most of the championship, until on round 29, Cruzeiro took the lead for good. The two teams were tied on points until round 31, when Cruzeiro, with a brace from Aristizábal, took a major 3-0 home win against second placed Santos, who boasted of national greats such as Robinho, Diego Ribas, Elano and Ricardo Oliveira. From then on, Cruzeiro only increased its lead until being confirmed champions with 2 rounds advance.

Having led the team to the domestic treble and scored 23 goals on the 2003 Campeonato Brasileiro Série A, Alex won the 2003 Bola de Ouro award and racked up all the years best player awards. Defender Maurinho and Chilean midfielder Claudio Maldonado also received individual awards.

2013 Serie A Title Campaign
After losing the 2009 Copa Libertadores final, Cruzeiro struggled for a couple of seasons, undergoing major changes in its squad and director board and unable to play in its home, Mineirão, while the stadium was being prepared for the 2014 FIFA World Cup.

In 2013 Cruzeiro was back to its revamped home stadium and was finally able to direct higher investments to its football department. President Gilvan Tavares, along with director Alexandre Mattos signed coach Marcelo Oliveira and over 20 players during the 2012-2013 off-season.

The team quickly started showing what it was capable of, barely missing out on the regional championship title and starting the  2013 Campeonato Brasileiro Série A with a stunning 5-0 victory over Goiás. After alternating with Botafogo on 1st place for many rounds, the team reached a definitive lead on the 16th round, which was carried on until reaching the title, before even playing its own game on round 35. No one's ever been crowned national champions sooner.

Many Cruzeiro players were elected on the league's best 11, with Everton Ribeiro winning the 2013 Bola de Ouro and Brazilian Football Confederation Best Player awards. Goalkeeper Fábio, defenders Dedé and Mayke, midfielder Nilton and coach Marcelo Oliveira also received individual awards.

2014 Serie A Title Campaign
With the amazing achievements of Marcelo Oliveira and his squad, led by goalkeeper/captain Fábio, along with Everton Ribeiro and Ricardo Goulart, Cruzeiro came to the 2014 season with the pressure to repeat its success.

With the goal of improving its record from the previous year, Cruzeiro started off by defeating rivals Atlético Mineiro to win the 2014 state championship. The team also reached the quarter finals on the 2014 Copa Libertadores, going further on the continental cup than any other Brazilian team that year.

By the start of the 2014 Campeonato Brasileiro Série A, Cruzeiro showed its strength achieving good results with its reserve squad, used while the team's main players were being used in the Copa Libertadores games.

Cruzeiro started using its main squad on round 6 of the Serie A and reached 1st place right then, never to let it go again. It marked the start of a record shattering 32 round lead, capped with the title two rounds before the end of the league. The percentage of points achieved by the team that year was only rivaled by Cruzeiro's own 2003 season record. It was the team's 4th national title and 2nd consecutive league win. Cruzeiro came close to achieving its second ever Domestic Treble, or Triple Crown, reaching the 2014 Copa do Brasil final.

As in 2013, several Cruzeiro players were featured among the league's best 11, with Ricardo Goulart winning the 2014 Bola de Ouro award and Everton Ribeiro taking his second consecutive Brazilian Football Confederation Best Player award. Defenders Dedé and Egídio, midfielder Lucas Silva and coach Marcelo Oliveira also received notable individual awards.

World Cup winners
The following players won the FIFA World Cup while playing for Cruzeiro:
  Tostão (Mexico 1970)
  Fontana (Mexico 1970)
  Piazza (Mexico 1970)
  Ronaldo (United States 1994)
  Edílson (South Korea/Japan 2002)

Cruzeiro Esporte Clube
Brazilian football club statistics